Clarence Williams (13 January 1933 – 14 January 2017) was an English professional footballer who played as a goalkeeper in the Football League for Grimsby Town and Barnsley.

References

1933 births
2017 deaths
People from the Metropolitan Borough of Gateshead
Footballers from Tyne and Wear
English footballers
Association football goalkeepers
Doncaster YMCA F.C. players
Doncaster Rovers F.C. players
Grimsby Town F.C. players
Barnsley F.C. players
English Football League players